Wiliberg is a municipality in the district of Zofingen in the canton of Aargau in Switzerland.

Geography

Of this area,  or 72.6% is used for agricultural purposes, while  or 17.9% is forested. Of the rest of the land,  or 12.0% is settled (buildings or roads).

Of the built up area, housing and buildings made up 4.3% and transportation infrastructure made up 6.8%.  Out of the forested land, all of the forested land area is covered with heavy forests.  Of the agricultural land, 16.2% is used for growing crops and 52.1% is pastures, while 4.3% is used for orchards or vine crops.

Coat of arms
The blazon of the municipal coat of arms is Per fess Argent a Vine branch Vert leaved of two of the same and fructed Azure and Azure a base-semi Mill-Wheel Or.

Demographics
Over the last 10 years (1997–2007) the population has changed at a rate of 2.6%. All of the population speaks German.

The age distribution, in Wiliberg is; 20 children or 12.5% of the population are between 0 and 9 years old and 20 teenagers or 12.5% are between 10 and 19.  Of the adult population, 15 people or 9.4% of the population are between 20 and 29 years old.  18 people or 11.3% are between 30 and 39, 32 people or 20.0% are between 40 and 49, and 28 people or 17.5% are between 50 and 59.  The senior population distribution is 11 people or 6.9% of the population are between 60 and 69 years old, 10 people or 6.3% are between 70 and 79, there are 4 people or 2.5% who are between 80 and 89,and there are 2 people or 1.3% who are 90 and older.

, there were no homes with 1 or 2 persons in the household, 18 homes with 3 or 4 persons in the household, and 30 homes with 5 or more persons in the household.  , there were 50 private households (homes and apartments) in the municipality, and an average of 3. persons per household.   there were 30 single family homes (or 47.6% of the total) out of a total of 63 homes and apartments.  There were a total of 1 empty apartments for a 1.6% vacancy rate.  , the construction rate of new housing units was 0 new units per 1000 residents.

In the 2007 federal election the SVP received 61.04% of the vote.  Most of the rest of the votes went to the SP with 9.13% of the vote.  In the federal election, a total of 70 votes were cast, and the voter turnout was 57.4%.

The historical population is given in the following table:

Economy
, Wiliberg had an unemployment rate of 0.66%.  , there were 21 people employed in the primary economic sector and about 9 businesses involved in this sector.  1 person is employed in the secondary sector and there is 1 business in this sector.  10 people are employed in the tertiary sector, with 3 businesses in this sector.

 there were 86 workers who lived in the municipality.  Of these, 51 or about 59.3% of the residents worked outside Wiliberg while 4 people commuted into the municipality for work.  There were a total of 39 jobs (of at least 6 hours per week) in the municipality.  Of the working population, 0% used public transportation to get to work, and 63.6% used a private car.

Religion

Education

In Wiliberg about 81.4% of the population (between age 25-64) have completed either non-mandatory upper secondary education or additional higher education (either university or a Fachhochschule).  Of the school age population, there are 14 students attending primary school in the municipality.

References

Municipalities of Aargau